Anthene wilsoni, the Wilson's hairtail or Wilson's ciliate blue, is a butterfly in the family Lycaenidae. It is found in Ghana (the Volta Region), northern Cameroon, southern Sudan, south-western Ethiopia, north-eastern Uganda, western Kenya, western Tanzania, Zambia and north-eastern Zimbabwe. The habitat consists of wet parkland savanna and dry savanna.

Adults are on wing from late November to mid-February.

The larvae feed on Entada abyssinica and Acacia abyssinica. They are associated with an unspecified ant species, living ants' nests in hollow trees. The larvae are shaped and colored like a woodlouse.

References

Butterflies described in 1935
Anthene